The Saint Joseph Saints was a primary name of the minor league baseball team that was based in St. Joseph, Missouri during various seasons between 1886 and 1953. Baseball Hall of Fame inductees Dizzy Dean and Earl Weaver played for St. Joseph teams.

History
St. Joseph was a member of the Western Association (1889, 1893-1897, 1906, 1927, 1939-1941, 1946-1951, 1953-1954) and Western League (1886-1887, 1898, 1900-1905, 1910–1926, 1930-1935), They were an affiliate of the St. Louis Cardinals (1930, 1946-1951, 1953), the Chicago Cubs (1939-1940), St. Louis Browns (1941) and the New York Yankees (1954).

They won six championships. They won three straight league championships, from 1933 to 1935 and again in 1940, 1947 and 1948. Their first came under manager Dutch Zwilling. Their second Wes Griffin and Earle Brucker, and their third under Earle Brucker. They won the fourth league championship in 1940 under Keith Frazier  the last two under Robert Stanton and Harold Olt.

In 1939, Dizzy Dean debuted his professional career with St. Joseph,  going 17-8 in 32 games with a 3.69 ERA.

The 1941 team moved to Carthage, Missouri on June 3, 1941.

The ballpark
Later St. Joseph teams played at Phil Welch Stadium beginning in 1939. The stadium is still in use today had been home to the St. Joseph Mustangs, a collegiate summer baseball league team in the MINK League since 2009. The address is 2600 Southwest Parkway, St. Joseph, 64503.

Notable St. Joseph alumni

Baseball Hall of Fame alumni

 Dizzy Dean (1930) Inducted, 1953
 Earl Weaver (1949) Inducted, 1996

Notable alumni

 Babe Adams (1917)
 Cy Blanton (1933) 2 x MLB All-Star; 1935 NL ERA Title
 Mace Brown (1930) MLB All-Star
 Pete Coscarart (1935)
 Joe Cunningham (1950 2 x MLB All-Star
 Paul Erickson (1939)
 Vern Kennedy (1932) 2 x MLB All-Star
Bill Lee (1930) 5 x MLB All-Star; 1938 NL ERA Title
 Dutch Leonard (1931) 5 x MLB All-Star
 Peanuts Lowrey (1939) MLB All-Star
 Sherry Magee (1923) 1910 NL Batting Title
 Fritz Ostermueller (1930)
 Vern Rapp (1947)
 Lew Riggs (1930) MLB All-Star

References

Saints
Defunct minor league baseball teams
Defunct baseball teams in Missouri
Chicago Cubs minor league affiliates
St. Louis Browns minor league affiliates
New York Yankees minor league affiliates
St. Louis Cardinals minor league affiliates
Defunct Western League teams
Defunct Western Association teams
Baseball teams disestablished in 1954
Baseball teams established in 1886